St Helens Beach is a coastal town and locality in the Mackay Region, Queensland, Australia. In the  the locality of St Helens Beach had a population of 197 people.

History 
Yuwibara  (also known as Yuibera, Yuri, Juipera, Yuwiburra) is an Australian Aboriginal language spoken on Yuwibara country. It is closely related to the Biri languages/dialects. The Yuwibara language region includes the landscape within the local government boundaries of the Mackay Region.

Giya (also known as Kia) is a language of North Queensland. The Giya language region includes the landscape within the local government boundaries of the Whitsunday Regional Council, particularly the towns of Bowen and Proserpine.

The town was originally known as Wootaroo but was changed to St Helens by the Queensland Place Names Board on 1 April 1973 and then changed from St Helens to St Helens Beach on 2 September 1989. St Helens was the name of a pastoral run belonging to pastoralist John Macartney in the 1870s. The word beach is a reference to the sandy beach along the coastline of the Coral Sea.

In the  the locality of St Helens Beach had a population of 197 people.

References

External links 

 

Towns in Queensland
Mackay Region
Coastline of Queensland
Localities in Queensland